Tripping Over is a British/Australian six-part drama series. Its first episode aired on Network Ten in Australia on 25 October 2006, and in the United Kingdom on Five on 30 October 2006. In the UK Tripping Over is repeated on Five Life.

The show is about three friends in London and two friends in Sydney; neither group knows each other but their parents do.  They both take flights to each other's countries, and the two groups meet at the stop-over in Bangkok, where a tragic event changes their lives.

The series then follows the two groups of friends as they continue on their trips to each other's countries and back home. The programme focuses on the major life changes that occur during the mid-20s, and how choices made here can affect a person's life for many years to come.

Summary

Five young people converge for a one night stop-over in Bangkok. Whether it was destined or just a stuff up, what happens there binds them together and profoundly alter the direction of their lives. The series follows the group, both together and separately as they travel to each other's countries or return home  some to reinvent themselves, others to find themselves. Woven through their stories are the lives of an older, but not necessarily wiser generation—still living the mistakes of their own 20s. Only one thing is certain, whatever your age, everything looks different from 11,000 miles away.

Cast
 Alexandra Moen as Tamsin Dalgliesh
 Daniel MacPherson as Ned Frost
 Abe Forsythe as Nic Kirkh
 Leon Ockenden as Callum
 Kathryn Drysdale as Lizzie
 Oliver Chris as Sam
 Rebecca Gibney as Lydia
 Lisa McCune as Annabel
 Paul McGann as Jeremy Frost
 Brooke Satchwell as Felicity
 Ramon Tikaram as Jim/Robbie
 Nicholas Bell as James Frost
 Jacek Koman as Magnus

Production
Conceived in 2003 by Andrew Knight and Andrea Denholm, who discussed the idea with Mike Bullen while on a weekend trip. Knight and Denholm wanted to make a series about the difference between backpacking in 1976 and 2006.
Filmed from 8 May to 11 August 2006.

Episodes

References

External links 
Tripping Over at five.tv
Tripping Over at the National Film and Sound Archive
 

Channel 5 (British TV channel) original programming
Network 10 original programming
2000s Australian television miniseries
2000s British drama television series
2006 British television series debuts
2006 British television series endings
2006 Australian television series debuts
2006 Australian television series endings
2000s British television miniseries